Zablon Simintov (born 1959), also known as Zebulon Simentov is an Afghan Jew, former carpet trader and restaurateur. Before his evacuation from Afghanistan to Israel in 2021, he was widely known as the only Jew still living in Afghanistan, and was also the caretaker of the country's only synagogue in the capital city of Kabul. On 7 September 2021, shortly after the Taliban takeover, he left Afghanistan with the help of a private security company organized by Israeli-American businessman Mordechai Kahana, after which it was discovered that a distant relative of Simintov, Tova Moradi, was actually the last Jew living in Afghanistan; Moradi also fled Afghanistan for Albania in October 2021.

Early life
Simintov (aka Zebulon Simentov) was born into an Orthodox Jewish family in the city of Herat in 1959, where he spent most of his early life until his eventual relocation to Kabul. His residence was severely damaged during the Taliban's rise to power in the Second Afghan Civil War, which forced him to move into the city's only synagogue. Despite that most Jews had already departed from the country by this time, with the majority settling down in Israel, Simintov did not permanently relocate; he briefly lived in Turkmenistan but returned to Kabul in 1998, by which time the Taliban had officially established the Islamic Emirate of Afghanistan. Simintov was detained, jailed and abused several times by Taliban militants during this period, and was also extorted by the group at his carpet warehouse in 2001.

Later life
Simintov lived at the synagogue in Kabul alongside Ishaq Levin, who was thought to be the only other Jew remaining in Afghanistan, until the latter's death on 26 January 2005 at around 80 years of age. The story of Simintov and Levin as the supposed only remaining Jews in Afghanistan served as the basis for a British play. Simintov deprecated Levin in an interview with British journalist Martin Fletcher; while Levin had initially welcomed Simintov into Kabul's synagogue following the latter's return from Turkmenistan in 1998, the two grew to greatly dislike each other due to personal feuds and religious disagreements.

In an interview with the Jewish American magazine Tablet, Simintov highlighted the difficulties of being the isolated and only remaining practitioner of Judaism in Afghanistan. He had to obtain special permission from the nearest rabbi in Tashkent, Uzbekistan, to slaughter his own livestock for meat in line with Jewish dietary laws, as this can normally only be done by a specially-trained Jewish butcher. Simintov received regular shipments of special kosher supplies on Passover from Afghan Jews living in New York. He has stated that he only wore his kippah in private and was hesitant to allow visitors into his synagogue.

Simintov lived alone in a small synagogue room and received donations from Jewish groups abroad as well as from sympathetic Muslim locals. His wife, from whom he is estranged, and his two daughters reside in Israel. When asked during an interview whether he would also emigrate to Israel and join his family, Simintov retorted, "Go to Israel? What business do I have there? Why should I leave?" In a 2007 video interview with Al Jazeera, Simintov suggested that he may be interested in moving to Israel to join his two daughters. However, he again expressed reluctance to leave in a 2019 interview, stating: "I don't speak Hebrew. I am an Afghan." Simintov has also said that he knows former Afghan President Ashraf Ghani personally. 

In November 2013, Simintov announced that he would close his kebab restaurant in March 2014 due to declining business after the reduction of American and NATO forces in Afghanistan.

Taliban taking over and Simintov's exit
In April 2021, Simintov announced that he would leave Afghanistan for Israel after the High Holy Days in September, fearing a resurgence of groups such as the Taliban after the US military began withdrawing. On 15 August 2021, three weeks before the first of the High Holy Days, the Taliban captured Kabul. Simintov remained in Kabul despite having been given chances to leave including by businessman Mordechai Kahana, who offered to pay for a private airplane to take him to Israel. Rabbi Mendy Chitrik of the Alliance of Rabbis in Islamic States involved the Turkish government in the efforts to rescue him from Kabul. While he insisted he would stay to take care of the country's last synagogue, it was later reported that his decision may have been influenced by his refusal to give his wife a get (a Jewish religious divorce). Get refusal can lead to a prison sentence in Israel. Another report stated he refused to leave as he owes money to his neighbours and wished to honour his debts. 

Eventually, he left in September 2021 with several neighbouring families, stating that it was not the Taliban, but the possibility of other, more radical Islamist groups such as IS-KP taking him hostage, which resulted in his exit from the country. After leaving Afghanistan, Simintov granted his wife a divorce. A month later, Simintov's distant cousin, 83-year-old Tova Moradi, also fled Afghanistan, to Albania in October 2021, fearing for her safety. Thus, Moradi was apparently the "last Jew in Afghanistan."

See also
 History of the Jews in Afghanistan

Notes

References

External links
History of Afghan Jews
The Virtual Jewish Tour: Afghanistan

1959 births
Living people
People from Herat
Afghan businesspeople
Afghan Jews
Afghan expatriates in Turkmenistan
Afghan emigrants to Israel
Afghan expatriates in Israel
Bukharan Jews
Turkmenistan Jews